The men's individual road race cycling event at the 1936 Summer Olympics took place on 10 August over 100 km. Ninety-nine cyclists from 28 nations competed. This was the first time that the cycling road race was conducted as a mass start event since 1896 and was one of six cycling events at the 1936 Olympics. The men's team road race was held in conjunction with this event, with teams having four riders and the team time taken as sum of the team's three best finishers. The individual event was won by Robert Charpentier of France, with his teammate Guy Lapébie in second. Ernst Nievergelt of Switzerland took bronze. They were the first men's mass-start road race medals for both nations, which had not competed in 1896.

Background

This was the second appearance of the event, previously held in 1896; it would be held at every Summer Olympics after 1936. It replaced the individual time trial event that had been held from 1912 to 1932 (and which would be reintroduced alongside the road race in 1996). French cyclist Robert Charpentier was the runner-up in the 1935 UCI Road World Championships. Three-speed bikes were innovative at the time, with many riders adopting them.

Germany and Great Britain made their second appearances in the event; the other 26 nations competing in 1936 each made their debut.

Competition format and course

The race was on a course that covered 100 kilometres, starting and finishing at the North Curve of the Avus motor racing circuit. It followed "relatively flat roads," with elevation shifts limited to between 32 and 80 metres above sea level and the steepest grade at 46.1 metres per kilometre.

Schedule

Results

Some of the cyclists with unknown times may not have finished.

References

Road cycling at the 1936 Summer Olympics
Cycling at the Summer Olympics – Men's road race